"Goodbye to Love" is a song composed by Richard Carpenter and John Bettis. It was released by the Carpenters in 1972. On the Close to You: Remembering The Carpenters documentary, Tony Peluso stated that this was one of the first power ballads, if not the first, to have a fuzz guitar solo.  "Goodbye to Love" was the first Carpenters hit written by Richard Carpenter and John Bettis.

Background
While visiting London, Richard Carpenter watched a 1940 Bing Crosby film on The Late Movie called Rhythm on the River. Carpenter noticed that the characters kept referring to the struggling songwriter's greatest composition, "Goodbye to Love". Carpenter said, "You never hear it in the movie, they just keep referring to it", and he immediately envisioned the tune and lyrics, starting with:

 I'll say goodbye to love.
 No one ever cared if I should live or die.
 Time and time again, the chance for 
 Love has passed me by...

He said that while the melody in his head kept going, the lyrics stopped "because I'm not a lyricist". He completed the rest of his arrangement upon his return to the United States.

While the Carpenters were working on the song, Carpenter decided that a fuzz guitar solo should be included. Karen Carpenter called guitarist Tony Peluso and asked him to play on the record. Tony remembers: "At first I didn't believe that it was actually Karen Carpenter on the phone but she repeated her name again. ... It was at this point that I realized it was really her and that I was speaking to one of my idols." She told him that she and Richard were working on a song called "Goodbye to Love", that they were familiar with Tony's work with a band called Instant Joy, and that he would be perfect for the sound they were looking for. Peluso first played something soft and sweet, but then Richard Carpenter said:
"No, no, no! Play the melody for five bars and then burn it up! Soar off into the stratosphere! Go ahead! It'll be great!"

John Bettis has said that Richard Carpenter kept calling him, raving about the guitar solo.  He was wondering why Richard was going on about the solo until he heard it.  The lyricist said he cried when he first heard the song because he had never heard an electric guitar sound like that.  He said Tony Peluso "had a certain almost cello sounding guitar growl that worked against the wonderful melancholia of that song". He went on to say the "way it growls at you, especially at the end" was unbelievable.

Release and reception
The finished product was released on June 19, 1972, and reached No. 7 on the Billboard Hot 100. It was the first song written by the songwriting team of Carpenter/Bettis to reach the US top ten. The Carpenters received hate mail (claiming that the Carpenters had sold out and gone hard rock) because of Richard's idea for a fuzz guitar solo in a love ballad.

"Goodbye to Love" has been described as the prototypical power ballad.  Cash Box said that the "funky guitar adds spice to the most notable Jack Dougherty production."

In the UK, the song was originally released in 1972 as the B-side to "I Won't Last a Day Without You". The sides were switched shortly after the record's release, and it reached No. 9 on the UK Singles Chart, becoming the duo's second top ten hit there (the first being "(They Long to Be) Close to You").

Chart performance

Weekly charts

Year-end charts

Personnel
Karen Carpenterlead and backing vocals
Richard Carpenterbacking vocals, piano, Hammond organ, Wurlitzer electronic piano, orchestration
Joe Osbornbass guitar
Hal Blainedrums
Tony Pelusoelectric fuzz guitar
Earl Dumleroboe

References

External links
 

Songs about heartache
Songs about parting
The Carpenters songs
1972 songs
1972 singles
Songs with lyrics by John Bettis
Rock ballads
Songs written by Richard Carpenter (musician)
1970s ballads
A&M Records singles